Gerald Swindle (born December 17, 1969) is a professional bass angler from Hayden, Alabama. He was named the 2004 and 2016 Bassmaster Angler of the Year.

Competitive statistics

Sponsorships
Swindle is sponsored by Vicious Fishing, Phoenix, Mercury Marine, 2 Handee, Moonpie Company, Lucky Craft, Arkie Jigs, MotorGuide, War Eagle Lures, Quantum Rods/Reels, Oakley, Vault, Toyota, Trokar, Zoom Bait Company, T-H Marine, Total Pain Solutions, and Sealy Outdoors.

References

 Gerald Swindle at Bassmaster
 

Living people
People from Blount County, Alabama
1969 births
American fishers